Un-Cut were a British group from Manchester, England, composed of Darren Lewis and Iyiola Babalola from the music production duo Future Cut, and vocalist Jenna Gibbons (Jenna G).

Prior to forming Un-Cut, their first collaboration was in 2001 with the Future Cut single "Obsession", which was released through drum and bass label Metalheadz. It was a number one hit on the UK Dance Chart.

They reached number 26 on the UK Singles Chart in March 2003 with "Midnight", which was originally released on their own Wired label, but they were subsequently signed to a recording contract with WEA.

They released an album titled The Un-Calculated Some (2003) on WEA. Their follow-up single, "Fallin'", appeared in the UK chart at number 63 for one week in June 2003, and the group were subsequently dropped by their label.

References

English electronic music groups
British drum and bass music groups
British musical trios
Musical groups from Manchester
Warner Music Group artists